is a Japanese retired professional wrestler better known by her ring name . Along with long-time tag team partner Chigusa Nagayo she formed Crush Gals, known for their mainstream popularity in the 1980s, and for being one of the most successful women's tag teams of all time.

Career
Born  on July 28, 1963, Asuka joined All Japan Women's Pro-Wrestling (AJW) in 1980, and had her professional debut on May 10 of that year.  She was an immediate success, winning her first title, the AJW Junior Championship, the following year, and the AJW Singles Championship in 1982.  In 1983 she formed a tag team, called Crush Gals, with Chigusa Nagayo. Crush Gals were huge stars for the (AJW), in the mid-1980s.  They feuded with Dump Matsumoto and the Jumping Bomb Angels.  Thanks to their fame, AJW's weekly television broadcast consistently brought in ratings over 12.0. Their fame also carried over into other media, including recording top ten singles.

In the late 1980s, Crush Gals broke up, and Asuka began a lengthy feud with Nagayo, which culminated in her achievement of the WWWA World Single Championship in 1989.  She retired later that year, but came out of retirement in 1994 and formed the Rideen Array, a faction consisting of fellow freelance wrestlers Jaguar Yokota and Bison Kimura.  She subsequently wrestled for many of the new women's promotions that arose at that time, such as Jd' and Arsion. She made one appearance for the WWF at the 1995 Survivor Series, teaming with Bertha Faye, Aja Kong, and Tomoko Watanabe. They defeated the team of Alundra Blayze, Kyoko Inoue, Sakie Hasegawa and Chaparita Asari. In 1998, she made a significant move when she joined GAEA Japan, the promotion run by her former partner, Nagayo. Asuka began her GAEA career as a top heel, feuding with Nagayo, and, in one storyline, winning control of the organization from her and eventually creating the Super Star Unit (SSU), a faction composed of veteran stars such as Akira Hokuto, Aja Kong, and Las Cachorras Orientales, among others.  However, near the end of 1999, Nagayo and Asuka united against a common rival, the Mayumi Ozaki-led faction Team Nostradamus, and, the next spring, reformed Crush Gals.  The storyline was huge news in Japan, and GAEA's show of May 14, 2000, featuring the debut of the reunited team, now called CRUSH 2000, was the biggest in the promotion's history.

Due to a neck injury, Asuka announced her retirement on November 3, 2004.  Her retirement was made official on April 3, 2005 where she and Chigusa Nagayo teamed up for the last time to defeat Chikayo Nagashima and Sugar Sato at GAEA's tenth anniversary show.

Championships and accomplishments
All Japan Women's Pro-Wrestling
AJW Championship (2 times)
AJW Junior Championship (1 time)
Unified Global Championship (1 time)
WWWA World Single Championship (2 times)
WWWA World Tag Team Championship (4 times) – with Chigusa Nagayo
Japan Grand Prix (1985)
Tag League the Best (1987) – with Chigusa Nagayo
AJW Hall of Fame (Class of 1998)

Arsion
Queen of Arsion Championship (1 time)
Twin Star of Arsion Championship (3 times) – with Mariko Yoshida (1) and GAMI (2)

GAEA Japan
AAAW Tag Team Championship (1 time) – with Chigusa Nagayo

JDStar
TWF World Women's Championship (4 times)

Ladies Legend Pro-Wrestling
LLPW Six Woman Tag Team Championship (2 times) – with Eagle Sawai and Shark Tsuchiya (2)

NEO Japan Ladies Pro-Wrestling
NWA Women's Pacific/NEO Single Championship (1 time)

Tokyo Sports
Joshi Puroresu Grand Prize (1997)

Wrestling Observer Newsletter awards
Wrestling Observer Newsletter Hall of Fame (Class of 1999)

References

External links
Online World Of Wrestling Profile
Sherdog

1963 births
Japanese female professional wrestlers
Living people
Sportspeople from Tokyo
Japanese female mixed martial artists
20th-century professional wrestlers
21st-century professional wrestlers
AAAW Tag Team Champions